Raymond William Shipp (27 September 1925 – 28 October 2019) was an Australian politician.

He was elected to the Tasmanian Legislative Council as the independent member for Launceston in 1968, serving until his defeat in 1982.

Shipp died on 28 October 2019 aged 94.

References

1925 births
2019 deaths
Independent members of the Parliament of Tasmania
Members of the Tasmanian Legislative Council